Pedicularis bracteosa also known as bracted lousewort is a flowering deciduous perennial plant with alternating cauline leaves that are linear/oblong to lanceolate, approximately 1 to 7 cm long. It has fibrous roots and grows to approximately 1 meter high. Its flowers form in densely clustered spike raceme, and range in color from yellow to bronze to red to purple. Its distribution is found in western North America including New Mexico, Colorado, Montana, mountainous parts of Washington and California, and in British Columbia.

Historically, the leaves have been used as an alternative treatment for skeletal muscle relaxation.

Gallery

References

bracteosa
Parasitic plants